Chronicle of a Summer (French original title: Chronique d'un été) is a 1961 French documentary film shot during the summer of 1960 by sociologist Edgar Morin and anthropologist and filmmaker Jean Rouch, with the technical and aesthetic collaboration of Québécois director-cameraman Michel Brault.

The film is widely regarded as structurally innovative and an example of cinéma vérité and direct cinema. The term "cinéma vérité" was suggested by the film's publicist and coined by Rouch, highlighting a connection between film and its context, a fact Brault confirmed in an interview after a 2011 screening of Chronique d'un été at the TIFF Bell Lightbox in Toronto.

In a 2014 Sight & Sound poll, film critics voted Chronicle of a Summer the sixth-best documentary film of all time.

Synopsis
The film begins with Rouch and Morin discussing whether it is possible to act sincerely on camera. A cast of real-life individuals are then introduced and led by the filmmakers to discuss topics related to French society and working-class happiness. At the movie's end, the filmmakers show their subjects the footage and have them discuss the level of reality that they thought the movie achieved.

Production
Chronicle of a Summer was filmed in Paris and Saint-Tropez, France. Rouch used synchronized sound, using a 16 mm camera connected through pilottone with a prototype of Nagra III, a transistorized tape recorder with electronic speed control developed by Stefan Kudelski.

Cast 
All cast members appear as themselves.
 Jean Rouch
 Edgar Morin
 Marceline Loridan-Ivens
 Marilù Parolini (as Mary Lou)
 Angelo
 Jean-Pierre Sergent
 Jean (worker)
 Nadine Ballot (student)
 Régis Debray (student)
 Céline (student)
 Jean-Marc (student)
 Landry (student)
 Raymond (student)
 Jacques (office workers)
 Simone (office workers)
 Henri (artist)
 Madi (artist)
 Catherine (artist)
 Sophie (One cover girl)
 Véro (young girl, uncredited)
 Maxie (Jacques' wife, uncredited)
 Jacques Rivette (cameo, scene deleted)

See also
Inquiring Nuns

References

External links
 
Chronicle of a Summer: Truth and Consequences an essay by Sam Di Iorio at the Criterion Collection

1961 documentary films
1961 films
French documentary films
French avant-garde and experimental films
Self-reflexive films
Films directed by Jean Rouch
Films produced by Anatole Dauman
1960s French-language films
1960s French films